Liza Figueroa Kravinsky (born 1962) is an American composer, filmmaker, and actress living in Arlington, Virginia, USA. She is best known for composing the Go-Go Symphony and founding the Go-Go Symphony ensemble.   She is also the filmmaker of the documentary Beauty in the Eyes of the Beheld.

Early life
Kravinsky was born in Summit, New Jersey, USA to Filipino immigrants. Her birth name is Elizabeth Teopaco Figueroa, with "Liza" as a nickname. Her father Armando Borja Figueroa was a medical doctor and her mother Elnora Teopaco Figueroa was a professional pianist and violinist.  After moving to New York State, the Philippines, and northern Virginia; her family settled down in Fort Washington, Maryland where she grew up with her brother Kenneth Figueroa, now a medical doctor.  She attended St. Stephens & St. Agnes School in Alexandria, Virginia; and Oberlin College in Oberlin, Ohio; where she studied music composition and theory.  She is married to filmmaker and former ABC News video editor Michael Kravinsky.

Musical work
Kravinsky composed and played keyboards for local pop, R&B, and go-go bands in the Washington DC area after she graduated from college.  From 1988 to 1990, she toured with Motown recording artist Stacy Lattisaw; TRJ, a faction of go-go band Trouble Funk; and go-go band Pleasure. In 1991, she composed for, directed, and performed with Robin Power and the Uptown Dames,  a Paisley Park project created by Prince (musician).

In 1994, Kravinsky became an in-house composer at American Film and Video production company in Silver Spring, Maryland.  While working in this company, she learned how to produce videos.

In 1999, Kravinsky's song "New Little Girl" appeared on the "Octaves Beyond Silence" compilation album, along with songs by Eve Ensler, The Indigo Girls and Meshell Ndegeocello.

In 2012, she composed the Go-Go Symphony, an innovative symphony that combines Washington DC’s go-go dance beats with classical, jazz, and funk genres.  She founded the Go-Go Symphony ensemble to perform it, along with other similar compositions; in partnership with full symphony orchestras, or as a stand-alone ensemble.

Film work
In 1996, Kravinsky co-founded Art Palette Productions, Inc., which produces videos, documentaries, and original music.  She created Beauty in the Eyes of the Beheld; a documentary about the lives of ordinary American women who are considered physically beautiful.  Among other corporate video productions, she produced “The First Three to Five Seconds,” a widely viewed Arab and Muslim cultural sensitivity training video for the United States Department of Justice.  She has also composed scores for independent films and acted in television commercials and video productions.

References

 Freeman, Macy (2014-06-26). "Go-Go Symphony Adds A Classical Note to Washington's Unique Sound", Washington Post.
 Paarlberg, Mike (2014-01-16).  “Go-Go and Classical, Together at Last”, Washington City Paper.
 Regan, Tim (2014-06-27).  “Go-Go Symphony at Atlas Performing Arts Center”, Washington City Paper.
 Figueroa Kravinsky, Liza (2014-02-13).  “Living up to the hype”, Arts Journal.com.
 Brookes, Stephen (2014-02-23).  “Go-Go Symphony, at Atlas Performing Arts Center, is well worth a listen”, Washington Post.
 Hammond, Kato (2014-02-18).  “Go-Go Symphony – An Intersection Where We Can Feel It All Over”, TMOTTGoGo Radio.
 Sandow, Greg (2012-12-21).  “Final mavericks: Jade Simmons and a Go-Go symphony”, Arts Journal.com.
 Unsung (2010-04-12).  “Unsung: Stacy Lattisaw”, IMDb.
 Ramonas, Andrew (2015-03-18).  “Go-Go Symphony Returning to H Street with Chuck Brown Drummer”, Hill Now.
 Ostrow, Lori (2014-05-30).  “Go-Go Symphony”, On Tap Online.
 Hammond, Kato (2013-03-29). "Go-Go Symphony: A Melodic Interview Session with Liza Figueroa Kravinsky", TMOTTGoGo Radio.

1962 births
Living people
American women composers
21st-century American composers
American filmmakers
20th-century American actresses
21st-century American actresses
21st-century American women musicians
21st-century women composers